Gene William Lamont (born December 25, 1946) is an American special assistant to the general manager of the Kansas City Royals. He was a catcher and manager in Major League Baseball who managed the Chicago White Sox (1992–1995) and Pittsburgh Pirates (1997–2000) and served as a coach for the Detroit Tigers (2006-2017). He batted left-handed and threw right-handed.

Early life 
Lamont was a Chicago Cubs fan all his life, growing up in Kirkland, Illinois and attending Western Illinois University.

Playing career
He was selected by the Detroit Tigers in the 1st round, as the 13th pick, of the 1965 amateur draft, and came up with them as a September call-up in 1970, when he had 13 hits in 44 at bats. The following year, he had one hit in 15 at-bats. In his biggest year, he had 92 at-bats, playing as a backup to Tigers catcher Jerry Moses. He returned to the Tigers upon being selected from the Richmond Braves in the Rule 5 draft on December 3, 1973. After 1975, his major league career, spent entirely with the Tigers, was over. He bounced around in the minors, on triple-A Evansville (with such players as Tom Brookens and Jerry Manuel) before stopping. He ended with a lifetime batting average of .233, with four home runs and 14 RBI in 87 games played. He had 37 hits in 159 at-bats, and stole one base.

The highlight of his time as a player was a home run in his first at bat of his career off the Boston Red Sox' Cal Koonce.

Managing career
In 1977 with the Kansas City Royals organization managing their single-A Fort Myers team for two years. After that, he guided the double-A Jacksonville Suns to a championship in 1982 and again in 1983, being named Southern League Manager of the Year in 1982.

Finally, after two seasons with the triple-A Omaha Royals in the minors, he worked his way up to the majors, serving as a third base coach for Jim Leyland's 1986 Pirates team. By the early '90s, with the Pirates emergence as a contender, Lamont was being considered by some teams for a managing job.

In 1992, Jeff Torborg left the White Sox to take the managing job with the New York Mets, and Lamont was named manager of Chicago. That year, the Sox did well, finishing 86–76, 3rd in the American League's Western Division. However, the following year the White Sox finished 94-68 under Lamont and were first in the AL West for the first time since they won 99 games in 1983 under Tony La Russa. His team consisted of such stars as Frank Thomas, Robin Ventura, Ellis Burks, Jack McDowell, Alex Fernandez, Jason Bere, and Wilson Álvarez.  Lamont took home the AL Manager of the Year award that year, and the team lost in the American League Championship Series to the defending champions, the Toronto Blue Jays.

In 1994, a baseball strike took place. When it began, the White Sox had the best record in the division by a narrow margin over the Cleveland Indians. However, the team did not fare as well the following year, starting out with an 11–20 record before Lamont was fired by general manager Ron Schueler in a move that shocked Lamont. He was replaced by Terry Bevington, who had served as the third base coach.

Lamont returned to the Pirates and began coaching again, before Leyland left in 1997, giving Lamont the job of manager once again. He was the third Pirates manager to have been a catcher during his playing career, along with Billy Meyer and Jim Leyland. Amazingly, in his first year Lamont finished second with a young, inexperienced team that was widely predicted to finish last. His team often upset many NL teams vying for playoff spots. He came in 2nd place in the Manager of the Year voting behind Dusty Baker of the San Francisco Giants.

There was no continued success for the Pirates though, finishing in last place in the Central in 1998. Expectations were perhaps a tad too high from New owner Kevin McClatchy, who bought the team in 1996 and thought the 2000 team (the last to play before the opening of PNC Park) would win 90 games, with Lamont not receiving an extension being a sign. After a terrible 2000 season that saw them lose 93 games, Lamont was fired and replaced by Lloyd McClendon.

He has a career record of 553–562, barely below .500 at .496, despite the many bad Pirates seasons. His all-time record in Chicago was 258–210, and he was 295–352 in Pittsburgh. Lamont had two first-place finishes, including the strike shortened year.

Lamont returned to coaching, with the Red Sox, the Astros, and (from 2006–2017) with the Tigers.

On November 12, 2011, Lamont was interviewed for the manager position for the Boston Red Sox after the Red Sox declined to exercise Terry Francona's 2012 option for manager. Lamont joined Torey Lovullo, Sandy Alomar Jr., Pete Mackanin, and Dale Sveum vying for the managerial position. As of November 27, only Lamont and Bobby Valentine were still in contention for the position. On November 29, it was reported that Valentine would be the new Red Sox manager.

In 2013, Lamont was moved to the dugout as the bench coach and was replaced by Tom Brookens, who was previously the 1st base coach.

On January 17, 2018, Lamont was hired by the Kansas City Royals to be the special assistant to the general manager.

Personal life
Lamont is married to Melody. They have two children, Melissa and Wade.

Managerial record

References

External links

1946 births
Living people
Baseball players from Illinois
Boston Red Sox coaches
Chicago White Sox managers
Daytona Beach Islanders players
Detroit Tigers coaches
Detroit Tigers players
Evansville Triplets players
Houston Astros coaches
Kansas City Royals scouts
Major League Baseball catchers
Major League Baseball third base coaches
Manager of the Year Award winners
Minor league baseball managers
Montgomery Rebels players
Pittsburgh Pirates coaches
Pittsburgh Pirates managers
Richmond Braves players
Rocky Mount Leafs players
Sportspeople from Rockford, Illinois
Statesville Tigers players
Syracuse Chiefs players
Toledo Mud Hens players
Western Illinois Leathernecks baseball players